Earl Kenneth Forsse (September 17, 1936 – March 19, 2014) was an American inventor, author, and producer who created the toy Teddy Ruxpin and the subsequent animated series The Adventures of Teddy Ruxpin.

After working for The Walt Disney Company, Sid & Marty Krofft Entertainment and other entertainment companies, he founded Alchemy II, Inc. One of Alchemy II's first projects was building the animatronic characters used on the television show Welcome to Pooh Corner. Forsse and his team then brought Teddy Ruxpin to the marketplace. Teddy Ruxpin became the top selling toy of 1985 and 1986 and was made by Worlds of Wonder.

In 2005, Alchemy II made an agreement with toy manufacturer BackPack Toys to have Teddy Ruxpin back on the shelves yet again and the toy made a return in 2006 before being discontinued again in 2010. In addition, the animated TV series was released for the first time on DVD in 2008.

Forsse died from congestive heart failure on March 19, 2014, aged 77.

Forsse was not only one of the co-creators of Disney's Haunted Mansion attraction, but was also contracted by the Sid & Marty Krofft organization to design a haunted house attraction for their (short-lived) theme park in Atlanta.

In other media 
Independent filmmaker Billy Tooma spent four years researching and making Ken Forsse: Come Dream with Me Tonight, a nine-part docuseries on the man behind Teddy Ruxpin. It was produced by Grundo Gazette's Vincent Conroy and debuted on January 3, 2022.

The Toys That Built America’s second season’s seventh episode, “80’s Tech Toys,” covered Forsse’s creation of the Teddy Ruxpin animated talking toy, with British actor, David Brooks, portraying the inventor.

References

External links
 
Grundo Gazette
 Interview with Ken Forsse

1936 births
2014 deaths
American inventors
Animatronic engineers
Disney imagineers
People from Butler County, Nebraska
Toy inventors